Richard F. Borstad (born  c. 1935) is a former American football player and coach. He served as the head football coach at the University of Minnesota–Morris from 1962 to 1966 and at Macalester College in St. Paul, Minnesota from 1970 to 1971. Prior to that, he served as an assistant coach his alma mater, the University of Minnesota, during the national championship 1960 team.

Head coaching record

References

Year of birth missing (living people)
1930s births
Living people
American football fullbacks
Hamline Pipers football coaches
Macalester Scots football coaches
Minnesota Golden Gophers football coaches
Minnesota Golden Gophers football players
Minnesota Morris Cougars football coaches
North Dakota State Bison football coaches
People from Detroit Lakes, Minnesota
Players of American football from Minnesota